The 130th New York State Legislature, consisting of the New York State Senate and the New York State Assembly, met from January 2 to July 26, 1907, during the first year of Charles Evans Hughes's governorship, in Albany.

Background
Under the provisions of the New York Constitution of 1894, re-apportioned in 1906, 51 Senators and 150 assemblymen were elected in single-seat districts; senators for a two-year term, assemblymen for a one-year term. The senatorial districts were made up of entire counties, except New York County (twelve districts), Kings County (eight districts), Erie County (three districts) and Monroe County (two districts). The Assembly districts were made up of contiguous area, all within the same county.

On April 27, 1906, the Legislature re-apportioned the Senate districts, increasing the number to 51. The apportionment was then contested in the courts.

The Legislature also re-apportioned the number of assemblymen per county. Nassau County was separated from the remainder of Queens County; Albany, Broome, Cattaraugus, Cayuga, Onondaga, Oswego and Rensselaer counties lost one seat each; Erie, Monroe and Westchester gained one each; and Kings and Queens counties gained two each.

On August 13, 1906, the new Senate apportionment was upheld by Supreme Court Justice Howard.

At this time there were two major political parties: the Republican Party and the Democratic Party. The Democrats and the Independence League nominated a fusion ticket headed by William Randolph Hearst. The Socialist Party, the Prohibition Party and the Socialist Labor Party also nominated tickets.

Elections
The New York state election, 1906, was held on November 6. Republican Charles Evans Hughes was elected Governor with about 749,000 votes against 691,000 for Hearst. The other six statewide elective offices were carried by the nominees on the Democratic/Independence League fusion ticket with about 720,000 votes against 710,000 for the Republican candidates. The approximate strength of the other parties was: Socialist 22,000; Prohibition 16,000; and Socialist Labor 5,000.

Sessions
The Legislature met for the regular session at the State Capitol in Albany on January 2, 1907; and adjourned on June 26.

James Wolcott Wadsworth, Jr. (R) was re-elected Speaker.

On April 3, 1907, the new Senate and Assembly apportionment was declared unconstitutional by the New York Court of Appeals.

The Legislature met for a special session at the State Capitol in Albany on July 8, 1907; and adjourned on July 26. This session was called to enact a new legislative apportionment.

The Legislature re-apportioned the Senate districts, and re-enacted the 1906 Assembly apportionment.

State Senate

Districts

Members
The asterisk (*) denotes members of the previous Legislature who continued in office as members of this Legislature. Dennis J. Harte, Otto G. Foelker, James A. Thompson, George B. Agnew, John P. Cohalan, William J. Grattan, H. Wallace Knapp, William W. Wemple, S. Percy Hooker changed from the Assembly to the Senate.

Employees
 Clerk: Lafayette B. Gleason
 Sergeant-at-Arms: Charles R. Hotaling
 Assistant Sergeant-at-Arms: Everett Brown
 Principal Doorkeeper: Christopher Warren
 First Assistant Doorkeeper: Fred S. Maine
 Stenographer: James C. Marriott

State Assembly

Assemblymen

Employees
 Clerk: Archie E. Baxter
 Assistant Clerk: Ray B. Smith
 Sergeant-at-Arms: 
 Stenographer:

Notes

Sources
 Official New York from Cleveland to Hughes by Charles Elliott Fitch (Hurd Publishing Co., New York and Buffalo, 1911, Vol. IV; see pg. 353f for assemblymen; and 366 for senators)
 Journal of the Senate (130th Session) (1907, Vol. I)
 STATE LEGISLATURE STILL REPUBLICAN in NYT on November 7, 1906
 JIMMY OLIVER LEADER OF ASSEMBLY MINORITY in NYT on January 2, 1907
 MURPHY'S WAR ON MAYOR IS STARTED AT ALBANY in NYT on January 3, 1907

130
1907 in New York (state)
1907 U.S. legislative sessions